John Thomas McManus (1904 – November 1961) was an American journalist active in progressive politics in the 1950s and 1960s best known as co-founder of the National Guardian, a left-leaning newspaper.

Background

McManus was born in New York City.

Career

McManus worked from 1921 to 1937 for The New York Times as a copy boy, police reporter, writer on bridge, and movie reviewer, except for a few years when he left to obtain a B.A. from Marietta College in Ohio. In 1937 he resigned from the Times to join the staff of Time magazine as radio critic.  In 1940, William Saroyan lists him among "contributing editors" at Time in the play, Love's Old Sweet Song. He resigned to join the staff of PM, a left-of-center New York City daily.

In the postwar period, McManus was actively involved in electoral politics. In 1948, he served on the national committee of the Progressive Party in support of the presidential candidacy of former vice-president Henry A. Wallace. In 1950 and 1954, McManus ran for Governor of New York on the American Labor Party ticket. In 1958, he ran again for Governor of New York, this time on the Independent-Socialist ticket.

In 1949, McManus co-founded the National Guardian, a progressive newspaper, with fellow former Times writer James Aronson. The paper was critical of the Cold War and McCarthyism and supportive of the labor movement and racial equality. He would co-edit the paper until his death.

In November 1955, McManus and Aronson were among 26 former and current New York Times employees subpoenaed by the Senate Internal Security Subcommittee. The subcommittee was investigating Communist infiltration in the American media. The subpoenas were based upon the testimony of Winston Burdett, a famous CBS war correspondent. In 1956, McManus testified, citing Fifth Amendment protections to avoid naming names or admit any knowledge of Communist activities.

Personal and death

McManus met his wife, journalist Jane Bedell McManus (ca. 1920-2005), while working at the National Guardian in the 1950s. They adopted two children, Enid Paul Mayberry and Sharon Mayberry.

He died, age 56, of a heart attack in 1961. His wife moved in 1969 to Cuba to live with her third husband William Lee Brent, whom she met and married on the island, until her death.

See also
National Guardian

Writings
 "M. Debalta, Reporter, Sees Ghosts," The New York Times, Aug. 15, 1937

References

External links 
 "John T. M'Manus, Newsman, is Dead,", New York Times, November 23, 1961 (subscription required)
  List of all movie reviews in The New York Times by John T. McManus
 "Eastland vs. The Times," Time, Jan. 16, 1956.
 Michael Munk, "A Celebration of 100 Years", letter to editor of The New York Times, May 12, 1996

American male journalists
American reporters and correspondents
The New York Times writers
1904 births
1961 deaths
American Labor Party politicians
Progressive Party (United States, 1948) politicians
Independent-Socialist Party politicians
Radio critics
20th-century American non-fiction writers
20th-century American politicians
20th-century American male writers